Daniel Bennett may refer to:

 Daniel Bennett (footballer) (born 1978), soccer player for the Singapore national football team
 Daniel Bennett (referee) (born 1976), English-South African football referee
 Daniel Bennett (journalist), Editor of BBC Science Focus
 Daniel Bennett (saxophonist) (born 1979), American saxophonist
 Daniel Bennett (shipowner) (1760–1826), British entrepreneur who gradually acquired a large whaling fleet - see List of ships owned by Daniel Bennett & Son

See also
 Daniel Dennett (born 1942), American philosopher